This list of wildlife artists is a list for any notable wildlife artist, wildlife painter, wildlife photographer, other wildlife artist, society of wildlife artists, museum, or exhibition of wildlife art, worldwide.

A
Jackson Miles Abbott
John Abbot
Joy Adamson
Jacques-Laurent Agasse
Richard Ansdell
John James Audubon
John Woodhouse Audubon

B
Don Balke
Peter Barrett
William Bartram
John Banovich
Robert Bateman
William Holbrook Beard
Frank Benson
William D. Berry
Thomas Bewick
Thierry Bisch
Steve Bloom
Karl Blossfeldt
Carl Brenders
Rembrandt Bugatti
John Philip Busby

C
Mark Catesby
Raymond Ching
James L. Clark
John Clymer
Guy Coheleach
Simon Combes

D
Thomas Aquinas Daly
Gerald Curtis Delano
B. L. Driscoll
Jan Dungel
Brian Lee Durfee
Gerald Durrell

E
Eric Ennion

F
Melanie Fain
Al Feldstein
Walton Ford
Charles Fracé
Louis Agassiz Fuertes
Alexander Fussell

G
Robert Gillmor
Luther Goldman
Elizabeth Gould
John Gould
Peter Benjamin Graham
Andrew J. Grayson
Katrina van Grouw

H
Ernst Haeckel
Ray Harm
Charley Harper
Jim Hautman
Joe Hautman
Robert Hautman
Robert W. Hines
Gary Hodges
Alan M Hunt
Lynn Bogue Hunt

I
Terry Isaac

J
Eric Jablonowski
Francis Lee Jaques
Genevieve Estelle Jones
Louis Paul Jonas
Denise Johanson

K
John Gerrard Keulemans
Don Kloetzke
Charles R. Knight
Frank Knight
Jörg Kühn
Friedrich Wilhelm Kuhnert

L
Edwin Landseer
Fenwick Lansdowne
Bonnie Latham
Karen Latham
Rebecca Latham
Edward Lear
Bruno Liljefors
M. Bernard Loates
George Edward Lodge
Blythe Loutit

M
Hamish Mackie
Ustad Mansur
Kathleen McArthur
Stanley Meltzoff
Maria Sibylla Merian
Ernie Mills
Lanford Monroe
Gustav Mützel

N
Stephen D. Nash

O
Bill Oddie

P
Roger Tory Peterson
Michael Poliza
François Pompon
Greg Poole
Rien Poortvliet

R
Terry Redlin
Henry Constantine Richter
Arthur Spencer Roberts
Derek Robertson
Chris Rose
Frédéric Rossif
Carl Rungius
John Ruthven

S
Sandra J. Schultz
J. Michael Scott
Peter Scott
Robert Scriver
Keith Shackleton
David Shepherd
David Allen Sibley
Wladyslaw Siwek
Richard Sloan
Joseph Smit
Anthony Smith
Daniel Smith
Robert Summers
George Miksch Sutton
William Swainson

T
Arthur Fitzwilliam Tait
Daniel Taylor
Archibald Thorburn
Clarence Tillenius 
David Tipling
Édouard Traviès
Peter Trusler
Charles Tunnicliffe
Dick Twinney

V
Juan Varela

W
D. Ian M. Wallace
Donald Watson
Alexander Wilson
Joseph Wolf
Art Wolfe

Z
Julie Zickefoose

Lists of artists
Zoology-related lists